
Gmina Siemień is a rural gmina (administrative district) in Parczew County, Lublin Voivodeship, in eastern Poland.

Neighbouring gminas
Gmina Siemień is bordered by the gminas of Czemierniki, Milanów, Niedźwiada, Ostrówek, Parczew and Wohyń.

Villages
The gmina contains the following villages having the status of sołectwo: Amelin, Augustówka, Działyń, Glinny Stok, Gródek Szlachecki, Jezioro, Juliopol, Łubka, Miłków, Miłków-Kolonia, Nadzieja, Pomyków, Sewerynówka, Siemień, Siemień-Kolonia, Tulniki, Wierzchowiny, Władysławów, Wola Tulnicka, Wólka Siemieńska and Żminne.

References

Polish official population figures 2006

Siemien
Parczew County